Rajko Ljubić is a Serbian film director from Subotica.

He mostly makes documentaries and short movies that deal with the life of the Bunjevci and Šokci Slavic groups from Bačka.

He has the donated many of his works to the Katolički institut za kulturu, povijest i duhovnost Ivan Antunović (Catholic Institute for the Culture, History and Spirituality Ivan Antunović).

Awards 

He won the Ferenc Bodrogvary Award in 2003 for the documentarie film Divojke slamarke, and producing theatre play Ždribac zlatne grive.

In 2006, he won Antuš Award for special merits.

Works 

Balint Vujkov, documentary film, 1993
Ivan Antunović, documentary film, 1993
Uskrs u Subotici, documentary film, 1994
Dužijanca, documentary film, 1994
Subotički tamburaški orkestar: Kao kap vode na dlanu, "musical videotape", 1995
Subotički tamburaški orkestar: Prvih 25 godina, documentary film, 2001
Sinagoga u Subotici, documentary film, 2002
Dužijanca 2002., documentary film, 2002
Đuga, short movie, 2002
Tri slamarke, tri divojke, documentary film, 2002
Pjesnik Jakov Kopilović, documentary film, 2002
Kruv naš svagdanji, documentary film, 2003
Slikar Stipan Šabić, documentary film, 2003
Vrepčije gnjizdo, short movie, 2003
Književnik Matija Poljaković, documentary film, 2003
Pripovitka o dijalektu, documentary film, 2003
Sto godina Karmelićanskog samostana u Somboru, documentary film, 2004
Jeka mog ditinjstva, short movie, 2004
Salaši u Bačkoj – njihov nestanak, documentary film, 2005 (co-author is Alojzije Stantić)
Božić na salašu, documentary film, 2005
Ana Bešlić, documentary film, 2005
Prof. Bela Gabrić, documentary film, 2005
Sudija i slikar Ivan Tikvicki–Pudar, documentary film, 2005
Proslava stogodišnjice Karmela u Somboru, documentary film, 2005
Pivaj Bačka veselo, monodrama, short movie, 2006. (as scenario was used the work of Milivoj Prćić, dedicated to football squad NK Bačka 1901), 
Tkanje i vezovi, documentary film, 2006
Pere Tumbas Hajo-muzika je bila njegov govor, documentary and portrait-movie, 2006
Tkanje i vezovi, etnografical documentary film, 2006
Čukundidino zrno ora, animirani film, 2006

During October 2007, Rajko Ljubić has, in production of Radio-Subotica, directed a radio drama, made after the scenario of Matija Poljaković Č'a Bonina razgala, mostly with amateur actors (mostly for the reason that at that time there were no Croat professional actors in Subotica). 
Making of this radio drama was part of planned series of radio dramas in Radio Subotica in Croatian.

References

External links 
 Zvonik Popis darovanih filmova
 Dnevnik Dodjela nagrada "Ferenc Bodrogvary"
 culturenet_hr – Infoservis – Filmska tribina i projekcije filmova o Bunjevcima

Croats of Vojvodina
Film people from Subotica
Serbian film directors
Living people
Year of birth missing (living people)